Dwight Thomas Ritchie (29 February 1992 – 9 November 2019) was an Australian professional boxer. He held the Australian middleweight title from 2014 to 2015 and the IBF Youth junior middleweight title in 2017.

Boxing career
Ritchie, nicknamed "The Fighting Cowboy", boxed professionally as a junior middleweight and middleweight for ten years between 2009 and 2019, compiling a professional record of 19–2 (two knockouts) and 4 no contests. Titles held by Ritchie during his career include the Victoria State middleweight title, the Australian middleweight title, the OPBF middleweight title, the WBF Asia Pacific middleweight title, the IBF Youth junior middleweight title and the IBF Australasian junior middleweight titles. In his last ring appearance on 14 August 2019, Ritchie lost his IBF Australasian title via ten-round unanimous decision to 14–0 Tim Tszyu at the ICC Exhibition Centre in Sydney, Australia.

Professional boxing record

Death
On 9 November 2019, during a sparring session with Michael Zerafa in preparation for Zerafa's rematch against Jeff Horn the following month in Australia, Ritchie took a body shot, retreated to his own corner and collapsed. Despite attempts to save him, he could not be revived and died. He was 27 years old and left behind a wife and three children.

References

External links

1992 births
2019 deaths
Australian male boxers
Middleweight boxers
Indigenous Australian boxers
Accidental deaths in Victoria (Australia)
Deaths due to injuries sustained in boxing
Sport deaths in Australia
Sportsmen from Victoria (Australia)
People from Shepparton